Myopites stylatus is a species of tephritid  or fruit flies in the family Tephritidae.

Distribution
This species is present in Europe (Albania, Bulgaria, Croatia, Slovenia, France and Italy), in the Near East and in North Africa.

Description

These small tephritids have a yellow or pale brown mesonotum, a long oviscape and smooth or tuberculate aculeus in the females.

Biology
Myopites stylatus forms galls on Dittrichia viscosa and its larvae are parasitized by several hymenopteran species, especially by the olive fruit fly (Bactrocera oleae), an important pests of olive crops.

References

External links

  Image on Diptera.info

Tephritinae
Myopites
Tephritidae genera